Mom and Sister (also known as Mother and Sisters and Oh, Mother! Oh, Sister!) is a South Korean television series that aired on MBC from November 4, 2000 to April 22, 2001. The story involves the lives of Kyong-bin, his parents, and older sisters.

Cast

Jang family
Go Soo as Jang Kyong-bin (22)
Hwang Soo-jung as Jang Yeo-kyong (mute sister, 30)
Kim Ji-young as Jang Nam-kyong (sister, 27)
Jun Soo-yeon as Jang Se-kyong (sister, 23)
Jo Kyung-hwan as Jang Hak-soo (father, 55)
Go Doo-shim as Na Jung-ok (Hak Soo's wife, 52)
Na Moon-hee as Kyong-bin's grandmother (75)

Kong family
Ahn Jae-wook as Kong Su-chul (Chan Mi's brother, 31)
Bae Doona as Kong Chan-mi (sister, 22)
Park Sun-young as Haeng-ja (Su-chul's girlfriend, 28)

Extended cast
Kim So-yeon as Noh Seung-ri (Kyong-bin's twin sister, 22)
Chang Mi-hee as Han Young-sook (Seung-ri's birth mother)
Ahn Jae-hwan as Kim Tae-sung (Seung Ri's boyfriend, 23)
Park Si-eun as Kwon Bo-ra
Kim Yeon-joo
Jung Wook
SOUNDTRACK 

Kim Sang Pil - My sole lover had gone

External links
Mother and Sisters official MBC website 

MBC TV television dramas
2000 South Korean television series debuts
2001 South Korean television series endings
Korean-language television shows